Gamigo Inc (trade name: WildTangent) is an American game services company based in Bellevue, Washington. It provides services to several PC manufacturers, including Dell and HP. Collectively, WildTangent's owned and operated service reaches over 20 million monthly players in the United States and Europe with a catalog of more than 1,000 games from nearly 100 developers.

The company launched an Android games service at the end of 2011 with T-Mobile. The company also manages the advertising sales for a group of gaming properties including Mochi Media, Sony Online Entertainment's Free Realms, PopCap, PlayFirst, as well as Artix's AdventureQuest, DragonFable, Namco, and MechQuest properties.

The company owns a patent portfolio covering in-game advertising and app delivery technologies.

WildTangent makes money through a combination of online sales, subscription, advertising, and micro-transactions using a proprietary micro-currency called WildCoins.

In 2019, German gaming company , which also owns Trion Worlds, acquired the company.

Games

WildTangent's catalog includes over 1,500 games from 3rd-party developers.

Approximately 30 of the games in the WildTangent catalog were produced by the company's own WildTangent Game Studios. The rest of the games on the WildTangent game network are from other game developers and publishers. This includes games like Mall World which the company has represented to integrate major brands like Levis.

Originally, WildTangent produced advergames for various companies, including Nike, Coke, and Ford. The company no longer develops advergames. WildTangent used to be a publisher of Sandlot Games. But now, it's only the distributor due to the rebrand of Sandlot Games.

Criticism
Users have complained that the company's products have an adverse effect on their PC's performance or are intrusive to the user's experience. PC Magazine wrote in 2004 that although the program was "not very" evil, some privacy complaints were justified as the program's user manual states that it may collect name, address, phone number, e-mail, and other contact information and could distribute the collected information with the user's consent. Concerns were also raised about the software's self-updating feature. In 2003, antispyware program Spybot classified WildTangent's original WebDriver as a potentially unwanted program (PUP). WildTangent no longer distributes or develops WebDriver.

In 2011, WildTangent challenged a patent infringement ruling against Hulu and itself by Ultramercial, LLC, which contended that the two companies had violated its 2001 patent , "Method and system for payment of intellectual property royalties by interposed sponsor on behalf of consumer over a telecommunications network", alleging that the patent was too abstract. The Court of Appeals for the Federal Circuit upheld Ultramercial's patent, stating that it "does not simply claim the age-old idea that advertising can serve as currency. Instead [it] discloses a practical application of this idea." The court also asserted that the technical elements required to implement the system described were intricate enough to not be abstract. On June 21, 2013, after being ordered by the Supreme Court to re-examine the case, the Federal Circuit upheld its decision and ruled that Ultramercial's patents were valid. However, the 2014 Supreme Court ruling in Alice Corp. v. CLS Bank Int'l narrowed patent eligibility for software, and the Supreme Court subsequently sent Ultramercial's case back to the Federal Circuit. In November 2014, the Federal Circuit invalidated Ultramercial's patent in light of the ruling in Alice, undoing two of its own previous rulings and freeing WildTangent from liability.

Genesis3D 
WildTangent owns the Genesis3D game engine. It was created by Eclipse Entertainment in 1997 and sold in part to WildTangent in 1999. WildTangent then acquired Eclipse Entertainment in January 2002. The engine was originally distributed as free open-source software and later under an open-source license. The first beta version of the engine was released on July 30, 1998. Release Candidate 1 was shipped on March 2, 1999. Notable games developed using Genesis3D include Catechumen (2000), Ethnic Cleansing (2002) and Special Force (2003), all first-person shooters.

References

External links
 

 
Video game development companies
Video game companies of the United States
Browser-based game websites
Companies based in Bellevue, Washington
1998 establishments in Washington (state)
Video game companies established in 1998
2019 mergers and acquisitions
American subsidiaries of foreign companies